Cheap Thrills is the second studio album by American rock band Big Brother and the Holding Company. It was their last album with Janis Joplin as lead singer before she started a solo career. For Cheap Thrills, the band and producer John Simon incorporated recordings of crowd noise to give the impression of a live album, for which it was subsequently mistaken by listeners. Only "Ball and Chain" was actually recorded in concert at Winterland Ballroom.

Cheap Thrills reached number one on the charts for eight nonconsecutive weeks in 1968.

History
Big Brother obtained a considerable amount of attention after their 1967 performance at the Monterey Pop Festival and had released their debut album soon after. The followup, Cheap Thrills, was a great success, reaching number one on the charts for eight nonconsecutive weeks in 1968. Columbia Records offered the band a new recording contract, but it took months to get through since they were still signed to Mainstream Records. The album features three cover songs ("Summertime", "Piece of My Heart" and "Ball and Chain"). The album also features Bill Graham, who introduces the band at the beginning of "Combination of the Two". The album's overall raw sound effectively captures the band's energetic and lively concerts. The LP was released in both stereo and mono formats with the original monophonic pressing now a rare collector's item. The album had been considered for quadraphonic format in the early '70s and eventually in 2002, was released as a Multichannel Sony SACD. The original quadraphonic mix remains unreleased.

Artwork and title
The cover was drawn by underground cartoonist Robert Crumb after the band's original cover idea, a photo of the group naked in bed together, was vetoed by Columbia Records. Crumb had originally intended his art for the LP back cover, with a portrait of Janis Joplin to grace the front. But Joplin—an avid fan of underground comics, especially the work of Crumb—so loved the Cheap Thrills illustration that she demanded Columbia place it on the front cover. It is number nine on Rolling Stones list of 100 greatest album covers. Crumb later authorized the sale of prints of the cover, some of which he signed before sale.

In an interview for the AIGA, Columbia Records art director John Berg told design professor Paul Nini, "[Janis] Joplin commissioned it, and she delivered Cheap Thrills to me personally in the office. There were no changes with R. Crumb. He refused to be paid, saying, 'I don't want Columbia's filthy lucre.'"

In at least one early edition, the words "HARRY KIRSHNER! (D. GETZ)" are faintly visible in the word balloon of the turbaned man, apparently referring to a track that was dropped from the final sequence. The words "ART: R. CRUMB" replace them.

Initially, the album was to be called Sex, Dope and Cheap Thrills, but the title was not received well by Columbia Records.

Release and reception
Cheap Thrills was released in the summer of 1968, one year after Big Brother's debut album, and reached number one on the Billboard charts in its eighth week in October. It kept the top spot for eight (nonconsecutive) weeks, while the single "Piece of My Heart" also became a huge hit. By the end of the year, it was the most successful album of 1968, having sold nearly a million copies. The success was short-lived, however, as Joplin left the group for a solo career in December 1968.

Outtakes originally to have appeared on the album have since been released on Janis Joplin compilations such as Farewell Song (in which Big Brother's original instruments were replaced with studio musicians from 1983, angering the band) and the Janis compilation box set featuring all original studio songs and live recordings. The 1999 re-release of Cheap Thrills features the outtakes "Flower in the Sun" and "Roadblock" as well as live performances of "Magic of Love" and "Catch Me Daddy" as bonus material.  In 2018, Columbia released Sex, Dope & Cheap Thrills, an album of outtakes, etc., from the Cheap Thrills sessions.

Critical reception

In a contemporary review, Rolling Stone magazine's John Hardin panned Cheap Thrills as living up to its title and being merely satisfactory: "What this record is not is 1) a well-produced, good rock and roll recording; 2) Janis Joplin at her highest and most intense moments; and 3) better than the Mainstream record issued last year."

Robert Christgau was more enthusiastic in his column for Esquire and called it Big Brother's "first physically respectable effort", as it "not only gets Janis's voice down, it also does justice to her always-underrated and ever-improving musicians." He named it the third best album of 1968 in his ballot for Jazz & Pop magazine's critics poll.

In a retrospective review penned in the 2000s, AllMusic's William Ruhlmann hailed Cheap Thrills as Joplin's "greatest moment" and said it sounds like "a musical time capsule [today] and remains a showcase for one of rock's most distinctive singers."

Marc Weingarten of Entertainment Weekly called it the peak of blues-rock, while Paul Evans wrote in The Rolling Stone Album Guide (2004) that the record epitomizes acid rock "in all its messy, pseudo-psychedelic glory". Cheap Thrills was ranked  number 338 on Rolling Stone magazine's list of the 500 greatest albums of all time, and later ranked number 372 in the 2020 edition. The magazine previously ranked it #50 on their Top 100 Albums of the Past 20 Years list in 1987. It is also listed in the book 1001 Albums You Must Hear Before You Die. On March 22, 2013, the album was deemed "culturally, historically, or aesthetically significant" by the Library of Congress and thus it was preserved into the National Recording Registry for the 2012 register. The album was named the 163rd best album of the 1960s by Pitchfork.

Track listing

Personnel
Big Brother and the Holding Company
Janis Joplinvocals
Sam Andrew guitar, bass on 'Oh, Sweet Mary', vocals
James Gurleyguitar
Peter Albinbass, lead guitar on 'Oh, Sweet Mary', lead acoustic guitar on 'Turtle Blues'.
Dave Getzdrums

Additional personnel
John Simon – piano, producer
Vic Anesini – mastering, mixing
Nicholas Bennett – packaging manager
Steven Berkowitz – A&R
Fred Catero – engineer
John Byrne Cooke – liner notes
Robert Crumb – cover artwork
David Diller – engineer
Mark Feldman – project director
David Gahr – photography
Diana Reid Haig – digital editing, mixing
Jerry Hochman – engineer
Bob Irwin – producer, reissue producer
Elliott Landy – photography, tray photo (gatefold photograph)
Jim Marshall – photography
Patti Matheny – A&R
Elliot Mazer – producer, mixing, assistant producer
Nathan Rosenberg – digital editing
Roy Segal – engineer
Smay Vision – art direction
Thomas Weir – photography, back cover
Jen Wyler – editing, mastering, assembly, authoring

Chart positions

Certifications

References

1968 albums
Big Brother and the Holding Company albums
Albums produced by John Simon (record producer)
Columbia Records albums
Live at the Fillmore East albums
United States National Recording Registry recordings
United States National Recording Registry albums